Oliver Nicholas Anthony Dillon (born 11 April 1998) is an English actor. He is best known for his role as Huffty in the CBeebies shows Raa Raa the Noisy Lion since 2011-2018 and Waybuloo. Dillon also voiced Lumpy the Heffalump in My Friends Tigger & Pooh airing on Playhouse Disney Channel.

Career
Dillon's first job was in the Basil Brush Show as a band member in Bingo's band, but he is best known for being the voice talent of Lumpy the Heffalump in My Friends Tigger & Pooh.
In November, Disney Television Animation releases the DVD Pooh's Super Sleuth Christmas Movie, where Oliver also provided the voice of Lumpy. In 2008 Oliver was cast in a new animated pre-school show due to air in May 2009 Waybuloo where he voices the character of Nok Tok. He also played Fizzy the leader of a gang in The Sparticle Mystery in 2011 and voiced Hufty in the animation Raa Raa The Noisy Lion.

Dillon was born with cystic fibrosis.

Filmography

References

External links
 My Friends Tigger & Pooh Internet Game
 Oliver Dillon on TV.com
 

1998 births
Living people
21st-century English male actors
English male child actors
English male film actors
English male television actors
English male voice actors
Male actors from Oxfordshire
People from Henley-on-Thames
People with cystic fibrosis